Outlaw King, stylized as , is a 2018 historical action drama film about 14th-century Scottish king Robert the Bruce during the Scottish Wars of Independence. The film largely takes place during the 3-year period from 1304, when Bruce decides to rebel against the rule of Edward I over Scotland, up to the 1307 Battle of Loudoun Hill. Outlaw King was co-written, produced, and directed by David Mackenzie. 

The film starred an ensemble cast led by Chris Pine as Robert the Bruce, alongside Aaron Taylor-Johnson, Florence Pugh, Billy Howle, Sam Spruell, Tony Curran, Callan Mulvey, James Cosmo, and Stephen Dillane. It premiered at the Toronto International Film Festival on September 6, 2018, and was digitally released on November 9, 2018, by Netflix. The film received mixed reviews from critics, with praise for its production design, sets, performances, and choreography, but criticism for its historical inaccuracies and clichés.

Plot 
In 1304, outside the besieged Stirling Castle, John Comyn, Robert Bruce, and other Scottish nobility surrender to Edward I of England. He demands their homage to get their land back.

Afterwards, Bruce spars with Edward's heir, the Edward, Prince of Wales, and is wed to his goddaughter, Elizabeth de Burgh. Lord James Douglas arrives, asking for the restoration of his ancestral lands but is denied, due to the previous Lord Douglas' so-called treason. The King and Prince depart Scotland, leaving Comyn and Bruce in charge, under watch of the Earl of Pembroke Aymer de Valence.

Elizabeth marries Bruce, but he respectfully delays the consummation. Not long after, his father, the Lord of Annandale, dies, fearing his friendship with the King of England may have been an error.

Soon after, while delivering taxes to the English, Bruce notes their unpopularity. Rioting ensues when rebel William Wallace is quartered. He plans another revolt and his family agrees. including Elizabeth. Trying to persuade John Comyn to join them, he threatens to inform Edward. Panicked, Bruce kills him within a church. The Scottish clergy offers him a pardon if he supports the Catholic Church in Scotland and he accepts the Crown of Scotland deal. King Edward hears of it, declaring Bruce an outlaw. The Prince of Wales is sent to crush the uprising, with the king's order that no quarter to be shown to any Bruce supporter.

Calling a council of nobles, most refuse to break their oaths to Edward. Despite the lack of support, Bruce heads to Scone to be crowned king of Scots. On the way, Douglas pledges his allegiance. The ambitious de Valence, brother-in-law to Comyn, tries to move against Bruce before the Prince arrives. To avoid bloodshed he challenges de Valence to single combat, who accepts but delays the duel a day, as it is Sunday. That night, Bruce and Elizabeth finally consummate their marriage, but the English launch a surprise attack. Elizabeth and Marjorie Bruce are sent to safety with his brother Nigel, and he fights a losing battle, during which most of the Scottish army is killed. Escaping with fifty men, they flee to Islay. On the way, John MacDougall parleys with them, bitter about the murder of his cousin Comyn but allows them to pass. Later, however, he attacks Bruce's entourage as they attempt to cross Loch Ryan. Some get away in boats, but Bruce's brother Alexander dies.

Prince Edward arrives in Scotland, searching for Bruce at Kildrummy Castle, only to find Bruce's wife, daughter, and brother. The prince has his brother hanged, drawn, and quartered, and sends the daughter and wife to England. Bruce's band presses on to Islay anyway; there, they learn of the fall of Kildrummy Castle. Bruce decides to take back the castle through stealth. The successful operation inspires him to begin guerilla warfare. Shortly thereafter, Bruce is reunited with his other brother, Thomas. In England, Marjorie is separated from Elizabeth to go to a nunnery. After Edward hears Douglas Castle has been re-taken, he goes after Bruce himself. He offers Elizabeth a pardon if she annuls her marriage to Robert, but she refuses and is placed in a hanging cage.

King Edward dies shortly after arriving in Scotland, and the Prince takes over his forces. Bruce fights the new king in a pitched battle at Loudoun Hill, despite being outnumbered six to one. As Edward's army is composed almost entirely of cavalry, Robert overcomes his army's size disadvantage in the battle with a spear wall hidden by a ditch. Attempting to attack the flanks, horsemen become bogged down in the mud, as anticipated. The English knights fall from their horses, many are slain, and the battle becomes an open brawl, where the Scots prevail over the disoriented English soldiers, with James killing the noble whom King Edward had granted his family's lands to. Realising the battle is hopeless, de Valence orders a retreat. However, determined to kill his nemesis, Edward does not join them. Instead, he duels Bruce as the Scots look on. 
Edward soon starts to lose, and realising he is about to be slain, he vomits in fear and cries for help. Bruce prevails, allowing Edward to leave unharmed.

In the epilogue: Elizabeth was released, the Prince of Wales was crowned King Edward II, then killed by his own lords in a rebellion some years later. Three hundred years later, Robert's descendant through his daughter unified the crowns of England and Scotland, and Sir James Douglas’ descendant, Marion Hamilton, married Kentigern Hunter, who died at the battle of Pinkie Cleugh, the last battle between England and Scotland before the union of the crowns, in 1547.

Cast
 Chris Pine as Robert the Bruce
 Aaron Taylor-Johnson as James Douglas, Lord of Douglas
 Florence Pugh as Elizabeth de Burgh
 Billy Howle as Edward, Prince of Wales
Tony Curran as Angus MacDonald
 Lorne MacFadyen as Neil Bruce
 Alastair Mackenzie as Lord Atholl
 James Cosmo as Robert de Brus, 6th Lord of Annandale
 Callan Mulvey as John Comyn III of Badenoch
 Stephen McMillan as Drew Forfar, Squire
 Paul Blair as Bishop Lamberton
 Stephen Dillane as King Edward I of England
 Dougie Rankin as Kings Guard
 Steven Cree as Christopher Seton
Kim Allan as Isabella MacDuff, Countess of Buchan
 Sam Spruell as Aymer de Valence, 2nd Earl of Pembroke
 Rebecca Robin as Margaret of France, Queen of England
 Jack Greenlees as Alexander Bruce
 Jamie Maclachlan as Roger De Mowbray
 Benny Young as Sir Simon Fraser
 Clive Russell as Lord MacKinnon of Skye
 Josie O'Brien as Marjorie Bruce
 Matt Stokoe as John Segrave, 2nd Baron Segrave
 Tam Dean Burn as John of Argyll

Production

Principal photography began on 28 August 2017 on location in both Scotland and England. Filming took place in various locations including Linlithgow Palace & Loch, and St Michael's Parish Church, Borthwick Castle, Doune Castle, Craigmillar Castle, Dunfermline Abbey, Glasgow Cathedral, Muiravonside Country Park, Mugdock Country Park, Aviemore, Isle of Skye (Talisker Bay, Coral Beaches and Loch Dunvegan), Glen Coe, Loch Lomond, Gargunnock, University of Glasgow, Blackness Castle, Seacliff Beach and Berwick-upon-Tweed and Tweedmouth (the latter two both in Northumberland - Berwick-upon-Tweed's bridge doubling for London Bridge). Principal production concluded in November 2017.

Release
The film had its world premiere at the Toronto International Film Festival on September 6, 2018. The premiere's runtime of 137 minutes and its pacing were criticised in early reviews, and Mackenzie subsequently cut nearly 20 minutes from the film. Cut material includes a battle scene, a major confrontation backdropped by a waterfall, an eight-minute chase sequence, and a scene in which Pine's character meets William Wallace in the woods. The film had its European premiere at the London Film Festival in October 2018 and was commercially released on November 9, 2018.

Reception
The website's critical consensus reads, "Muddy and bloody to a fault, Outlaw King doesn't skimp on the medieval battle scenes, but tends to lose track of the fact-based legend at the heart of its story." On Metacritic, the film has a weighted average score of 59 out of 100, based on 38 critics, indicating "mixed or average reviews".

Accolades

Historical authenticity

The film implies that Robert I ("Robert the Bruce") began his rebellion almost immediately after the execution of William Wallace, implying that he intended to avenge Wallace. He began his rebellion a full year after Wallace's death. During the intermediate period, Edward I became suspicious of Robert I and ordered him to stay at Kildrummy Castle.

The film shows Robert I marrying Elizabeth de Burgh after surrendering to Edward I. Bruce's second marriage actually occurred years before in 1302.

The film's depiction of Edward II's role in the Battle of Loudoun Hill is heavily flawed. It is unlikely that he was present at the battle in any capacity. Moreover, it is certain that he would not have challenged Bruce to single combat. Even if he had been present and challenged Bruce to personal combat, a hostage as valuable as Edward II would not have been allowed to flee.

In addition to Edward II's presence, the depiction of the Battle of Loudoun Hill incorporates several other elements from the later and more decisive Battle of Bannockburn, such as the death of Robert de Clifford.

The title character in Outlaw King is that of an enigmatic and well-behaved man of the people who desires to restore Scotland to its inhabitants. However, historian Fiona Watson notes the real Robert I was most likely cold, canny, and driven by his personal ambition.

The color yellow is mostly absent from the clothing of the fighting men. In contrast, yellow dye was not only the most common dye in Scotland during the period, it was highly favoured by the fighters with the means to afford it. Historian Fergus Cannan notes that while many historical writers comment on its prevalence, it remains absent from appearances in popular culture related to Scottish history.

The film depicts the character of Edward II as a cruel and oppressive person who is eager to succeed his father despite any historical evidence of Edward II having displayed such traits. On the contrary, Edward II was reluctant to assume the mantle of kingship and was known to be generous with his servants.

The film portrays Edward I dying before the battle of Loudoun Hill when, in actuality, he died several months later. Furthermore, the film implies that Edward I was buried where he died when, in fact, he was interred at Westminster Abbey in London.

In the film, when Robert I tells his brothers about his plan to start a rebellion, artichokes can be seen on the table. However, artichokes were not introduced to the British Isles until the 16th century.

See also
Robert the Bruce (2019) stars Angus Macfadyen as Robert the Bruce, but depicts different events.

References

External links
  on Netflix
 
 
 
 

2018 films
2018 action drama films
2010s biographical films
2010s historical action films
2010s historical adventure films
2018 war drama films
Action drama films based on actual events
2010s action war films
American action drama films
American biographical drama films
American historical action films
American historical adventure films
American war drama films
Biographical action films
Biographical films about Scottish royalty
British action drama films
Scottish films
British historical action films
British historical adventure films
British war drama films
Epic films based on actual events
Historical epic films
Films about death
Films about violence
Films directed by David Mackenzie (director)
Films set in castles
Films set in the 14th century
Films set in Scotland
Films shot in Scotland
English-language Scottish films
English-language Netflix original films
War epic films
War films based on actual events
Robert the Bruce
Cultural depictions of Edward I of England
2010s English-language films
2010s American films
2010s British films